

Group A

Head Coach: Les Reed

Head Coach: António José Baptista De Sousa Violante

Head Coach: Brian Kerr

Head Coach: Sergei Stukashov

Group B

Head Coach: Josef Krejča

Head Coach: Hans Brun Larsen

Head Coach: Timo Liekoski

Head Coach: Anton Valovič

Group C

Head Coach: Bernd Stöber

Head Coach: András Sarlós

Head Coach: Avraham Bachar

Head Coach: Arno Pijpers

Group D



Head Coach: Antoni Szymanowski

Head Coach: Mihai Ianovschi

Head Coach: Juan Santisteban

UEFA European Under-17 Championship squads